Yury Ivanovich Zakharevich (born January 18, 1963) is a former Olympic weightlifter for the Soviet Union. He trained at Dynamo in Dimitrovgrad. Yury competed in the middle-heavyweight (90 kg), sub-heavyweight (100 kg) and heavyweight (110 kg) weight classes during his career.

Yury Zakharevich has been described as one of the most technically gifted weightlifters of all time. In his analysis of the snatch technique of Yury Zakharevich, the biomechanist Robert Roman said that "Zakharevich raised the barbell in the snatch to "the minimal possible height of the lift lifters of his height can raise a barbell and still successfully fix it overhead."

Weightlifting achievements 
 Olympic champion (1988);
 Senior world champion (1985–1987);
 Silver medalist in Senior World Championships (1981 & 1982);
 European champion (1984–1988);
 Silver medalist in European Championships (1981, 1982, & 1990);
 Set 36 world records during career.

Career bests 
 Snatch: 210.0 kg in the class to 110 kg;
 Clean and jerk: 250.5 kg 1988 on Cardiff in the class to 110 kg;
 Total: 440.0 kg (200.0 + 240.0) 1983 on Odessa in the class to 100 kg;
 Total: 455.0 kg (210.0 + 245.0) 1988 Summer Olympics in the class to 110 kg.

Major results

World records 
3/21/1981 Snatch 181 kg Middle Heavyweight Lvov
3/21/1981 Snatch 182 kg Middle Heavyweight Lvov
6/20/1981 Snatch 183.5 kg Middle Heavyweight Lignano-Sabbiadoro
6/20/1981 Total 405 kg Middle Heavyweight Lignano-Sabbiadoro
12/21/1981 Clean & Jerk 232.5 kg Sub Heavyweight Donetsk
12/24/1981 Snatch 188 kg Sub Heavyweight Donetsk
12/24/1981 Snatch 192.5 kg Sub Heavyweight Donetsk
12/24/1981 Total 417.5 kg Sub Heavyweight Donetsk
12/24/1981 Total 425 kg Sub Heavyweight Donetsk
5/22/1982 Snatch 193.5 kg Sub Heavyweight Dnipropetrovsk
5/22/1982 Snatch 195 kg Sub Heavyweight Dnipropetrovsk
5/22/1982 Clean & Jerk 234 kg Sub Heavyweight Dnipropetrovsk
5/22/1982 Clean & Jerk 235 kg Sub Heavyweight Dnipropetrovsk
5/22/1982 Total 427.5 kg Sub Heavyweight Dnipropetrovsk
5/22/1982 Total 430 kg Sub Heavyweight Dnipropetrovsk
9/25/1982 Snatch 195.5 kg Sub Heavyweight Ljubljana
11/3/1982 Snatch 195.5 kg Heavyweight Haskovo
3/4/1983 Snatch 200 kg Sub Heavyweight Odessa
3/4/1983 Clean & Jerk 240 kg Sub Heavyweight Odessa
 3/4/1983 Total 432.5 kg Sub Heavyweight Odessa
3/4/1983 Total 440 kg Sub Heavyweight Odessa
9/16/1984 Snatch 197.5 kg Heavyweight Varna
9/16/1984 Snatch 200.5 kg Heavyweight Varna
11/15/1986 Snatch 201 kg Heavyweight Sofia
11/15/1986 Clean & Jerk 248 kg Heavyweight Sofia
11/15/1986 Total 445 kg Heavyweight Sofia
11/15/1986 Total 447.5 kg Heavyweight Sofia
5/9/1987 Snatch 202.5 kg Heavyweight Reims
9/13/1987 Snatch 203 kg Heavyweight Ostrava
4/30/1988 Snatch 203.5 kg Heavyweight Cardiff
4/30/1988 Clean & Jerk 250.5 kg Heavyweight Cardiff
4/30/1988 Total 450 kg Heavyweight Cardiff
4/30/1988 Total 452.5 kg Heavyweight Cardiff
9/27/1988 Snatch 205 kg Heavyweight Seoul
9/27/1988 Snatch 210 kg Heavyweight Seoul
9/27/1988 Total 455 kg Heavyweight Seoul

References 

1963 births
Living people
Sportspeople from Tver Oblast
Honoured Masters of Sport of the USSR
Recipients of the Order of the Red Banner of Labour
Dynamo sports society athletes
European Weightlifting Championships medalists
Medalists at the 1988 Summer Olympics
Olympic gold medalists for the Soviet Union
Olympic medalists in weightlifting
Olympic weightlifters of the Soviet Union
Weightlifters at the 1988 Summer Olympics
World Weightlifting Championships medalists
Russian male weightlifters
Soviet male weightlifters